Kurt Christopher Sauer (born January 16, 1981) is an American former professional ice hockey defenseman who played seven seasons in the National Hockey League (NHL). He played for the Mighty Ducks of Anaheim, Colorado Avalanche, and Phoenix Coyotes. Sauer was born in St. Cloud, Minnesota, but grew up in Sartell, Minnesota. Sauer is now the Assistant Coach for the Wayzata Bantam AA hockey team.

Playing career
Sauer was drafted 88th overall in the 2000 NHL Entry Draft by the Colorado Avalanche. Sauer remained unsigned and continued to play for his junior team the Spokane Chiefs. Unable to agree to a contract with the Avalanche, in June 2002, Sauer was signed by the Mighty Ducks of Anaheim on the influence of new coach Mike Babcock, who coached Sauer at the Spokane Chiefs.

In Sauer's first professional season in 2002–03 he made the jump to the NHL with Anaheim and was amongst the league leaders for worst Plus/Minus. The following year on February 21, 2004, Sauer was traded to the team that drafted him, the Colorado Avalanche, for Martin Skoula. Sauer spent the next 4½ years with the Avalanche used as one of their primary shut down defenseman when not hampered by injury before leaving as a free agent.

On July 1, 2008, Sauer signed a four-year  free agent deal with the Phoenix Coyotes worth an average of $1.75 million per year. In his first season with the Coyotes in 2008–09, Sauer played his most regular season games since his rookie year with 68 games for 7 points.

In preparation for the 2009–10 season, Sauer was initially injured in a September pre-season game against the Anaheim Ducks. In receiving an innocuous hit into the boards, Sauer's head whip-lashed and resulted in nerve damage through the neck and head which blurred his eyesight. Sauer continued to practice and played in the season opener against the Los Angeles Kings on October 2, 2009, but was still affected by his eyesight. Scratched for conditioning, Sauer suffered the symptoms of post-concussion syndrome. He continued to rehabilitate but by the All-Star break in February he was ruled out for the season after still suffering major symptoms and swelling.

Despite intensive therapy programs and numerous specialist visits, Sauer was unable to gain a clear diagnosis and remained sidelined with concussion symptoms for the remaining three years of his contract with the Coyotes. Although unlikely to ever resume his professional career, he was still hopeful of a return, and has made slow progress through sensory rehabilitation to restore brain balance.

Personal life
Kurt and wife Carmen have six children together.

Sauer comes from a distinguished sports family. His father, Curt, played professional baseball in the Minnesota Twins system. He is the older brother of Michael Sauer, a former defenseman who played for the New York Rangers whose career was also ended by concussions. In addition to younger brother, Michael, an older brother, Kent, was a draftee of the Nashville Predators who was forced to retire due to knee problems. His oldest brother Craig played college football at the University of Minnesota and played in the NFL with the Atlanta Falcons and the Minnesota Vikings until a foot injury forced him into retirement. He also has two sisters that played college basketball and soccer.

Career statistics

Awards and honors

References

External links

1981 births
Living people
American men's ice hockey defensemen
Colorado Avalanche draft picks
Colorado Avalanche players
Ice hockey players from Minnesota
Lowell Lock Monsters players
North Iowa Huskies players
Mighty Ducks of Anaheim players
Sportspeople from St. Cloud, Minnesota
People from Sartell, Minnesota
Phoenix Coyotes players
Spokane Chiefs players